Dr. A. K. Viswanathan, IPS, is an Indian Police Service officer of the 1990 batch. He is presently in the rank of Director General of Police and serves as the Managing Director of Tamil Nadu Police Housing Corporation Limited, a wholly owned Company of the Government of Tamil Nadu. TNPHC is engaged in various projects related to police housing and infrastructure. He served as the Commissioner of Police, Greater Chennai, from May 2017 to 1 July 2020.

Early life and education
Born in Ayyampalayam near Pollachi, in Coimbatore district of Tamil Nadu, Viswanathan is a third-generation police officer in his family. His wife, Seema Agrawal is also an IPS officer and is presently an DGP rank officer of the Tamil Nadu cadre.

Viswanathan grew up mostly in small towns studying in 11 schools, finally in Government Higher Secondary School, Bhavani, presently in Erode district.  He joined B.Sc Chemistry in Presidency College, Chennai but dropped out after a year. He thereafter pursued a B.A. in History from Loyola College and graduated with distinction. Subsequently, he studied law at the Madras Law College specialising in Insurance Law. After joining  the IPS he did his master's degree in Mercantile law and completed his Ph.D in Criminal Law.

After completing the first year of B.L. in Madras Law College, he took a year off and went to New Delhi to prepare for the UPSC exams. He returned and continued the B.L. course and his efforts to get into the Civil Services. In the 1990 UPSC results, he secured the first rank from the state of Tamil Nadu and opted for the Indian Police Service. He was allotted to the Tamil Nadu Cadre. He is an avid reader, a hobby he pursues, with particular interest in literature related to World History.

Career
On completion of his training, Viswanathan was posted as the Assistant Superintendent of Police (ASP) Dharmapuri Sub Division, in Dharmapuri district. On promotion as the Superintendent of Police, he was posted as the Deputy Commissioner of Police Law and Order, Madurai city and later as the Superintendent of Police Madurai Rural District.

After the 14 February 1998 serial bomb blasts in Coimbatore City that resulted in the death of 69 people, Viswanathan was chosen to be posted as the Superintendent of Police, State Special Branch. He also had a brief stint in the Chennai City Traffic police. This was followed by a stint in the Central Bureau of Investigation ( CBI ) as the Superintendent of Police, Anti Corruption Branch, Tamil Nadu and, on promotion, as the Deputy Inspector General of Police, Special Crime Branch, Southern and Western regions of India. During 2002 he also held full additional charge of the Cochin Anti Corruption branch of CBI, looking after the Kerala state.

In 2006, he was posted as the DIG Intelligence Tamil Nadu, and this tenure witnessed the conflict between the Sri Lankan Army and the consequent fallout in Tamil Nadu. During this time the activities of Muslim fundamentalists along with the prosecution of the accused Coimbatore serial bomb blast cases created quite a tension in the state and he played an important role in providing intelligence inputs to handle the situation

On promotion as the Inspector General of police, he was posted as the Joint Director in the Directorate of Vigilance and Anti Corruption. Within a short time, he was posted as the Additional Commissioner of Police (Law and Order), Chennai City. Within a short time he was posted as the Additional Commissioner of Police (Law and Order), Chennai City. Within three months of taking the post, there was a police action against lawyers in the Madras High Court campus on February 19, 2009. Lengthy legal procedures in the High Court and the Supreme Court followed this episode.

It was during this period that he was transferred and posted as the Joint Resident Commissioner, Tamil Nadu House. This was to enable him to take over as the officer on special duty (OSD) to the newly appointed Union Cabinet Minister of Chemicals and Fertilizers M.K.Azhagiri. Within a month and a half after this, he opted to go back to the Tamil Nadu State.

From TN House he was transferred as the Chief of Vigilance and Security in Tamil Nadu Newsprint and Papers Limited. After a year and half in TNPL Karur, he was posted as the Commissioner of police, Coimbatore City. He held this post three and half years as the longest serving Commissioner of Police, Coimbatore City. He took various steps to bring police and people closer and to remove the animosity and distrust for police that people generally got used to. During his tenure, as per the National Crime Records Bureau data, crimes reduced four-fold in Coimbatore city. Also, while the Tamil Nadu came first In the recovery of stolen properties in the entire country at 66%, Coimbatore City came first in the state recovering at 88% of the properties stolen.

During this stint, he resided in the official residence of the Commissioner of Police. It was the same residence where his grandfather had worked as an orderly. It is noteworthy that Viswanathan's  father also served in the Tamil Nadu Police Force making him a rare third-generation police official. 

On promotion as the Additional Director General of Police (ADGP) in November 2015, he was posted as the Chief Vigilance Officer of the Metro Transport Corporation. After a week, he was made the ADGP Home Guards, Tamil Nadu, where he served for about a year and a half. During the massive floods of Chennai in December 2015, he organized the Home Guards and volunteers and was instrumental in coordinating relief efforts including preparation and distribution of food for about 2 lakh people affected by the floods.

Later, Viswanathan assumed charge as the Commissioner of Police, Greater Chennai Police on May 15, 2017 an office he held till July 1, 2020.

Tenure as Police Commissioner of Chennai 
The Greater Chennai Police under his stewardship has strived to maintain peace and law and order and more importantly, constantly innovated to embed contemporary technology in crime prevention and detection efforts thereby enabling a markedly increased digital footprint in police systems and processes. 

Viswanathan was instrumental in bringing the Greater Chennai jurisdiction under complete CCTV surveillance under the ‘ Third Eye ‘ programme to enhance Crime prevention and detection in the city of Chennai.  This project envisaged the installation of over 250,000 CCTV cameras across Chennai, a first of its kind initiative. Other significant digital initiatives implemented in his tenure include the Facetgr app, a unique face recognition app which enables instant identification and matching of suspects with reference to pre-existing police records.

The internet and social media, have in addition to benefits, spawned various newer types of crimes.  The Greater Chennai Police uses the very same social media to enhance citizen awareness of crimes such as victimisation, revenge actions, cyberstalking and phishing through short yet high impact video films to inculcate caution in use of social media.

His tenure marked by significant Digital Transformation initiatives of the Chennai City police has resulted in a higher level of peace and order in Chennai.  As per the NCRB data, Greater Chennai City was declared as the safest metropolitan city in the country for women and children. K-4 Anna Nagar police station was adjudged the fifth best police station in the entire country consisting of 15,555 police stations.  Tamil Nadu also was adjudged as the best state for the maintenance of law and order, by India Today in 2018 for which the contribution of Greater Chennai Police was substantial.

Gifting of Pennycuick Bust to UK 

A white marble bust of Colonel John Pennycuick, the British Army engineer who sold his property in England to build the Mullaperiyar dam, was gifted to his descendants by Dr Viswanathan. This statue was unveiled at St Peter's Church in Frimley, UK on 12 January 2019 by Indian High Commission Minister A S Rajan.

Awards and recognition 
Viswanathan was awarded the President's Police Medal twice. Once for Meritorious Service in 2006 and the second President Police Medal for Distinguished service in 2017. He also received an award for taking prompt action on CM special cell petitions in March 2018.

Jan 2018 - As a part of India Road Safety Mission a comprehensive Road Safety Index, rating of ten cities were undertaken with key parameters like traffic control, people safety, pedestrian rights, lighting and maintenance, heavy vehicle management, cleanliness etc. In this regard, Greater Chennai Traffic Police emerged as the winner and was awarded the "Best City – Motor Laws and Traffic Control". This award was presented to Greater Chennai Traffic Police by Shri. Nitin Jairam Gadkari, Hon’ble Minister for Road Transport & Highways, Shipping and Water Resources, River Development & Ganga Rejuvenation, Government of India, at New Delhi.

August 2019 – The Tamil Nadu Chief Minister's Best Practices Award, Greater Chennai Police Commissionerate received the honour for installation of ‘Third Eye’ – the CCTV cameras and using Facetagr app for crime detection in the independence day celebrations held on 15 August 2019.

The SKOCH awards  are conferred by an independent organisation recognising projects and institutions which undertake efforts in the areas of digital, financial and social inclusions for the betterment of the country and seek to celebrate human excellence and agents of change in the Indian society. These awards are based on evaluation by a National Jury, Peer Evaluation Process and Online voting. The Chennai City Police won three awards in 2019 in recognition of their efforts in the areas of digital, financial and social inclusions for betterment of the country.
a. Effective implementation of its CCTV surveillance project ‘Third Eye’ (Sep 2019).
b. Introduction of digital technology for cashless payment of fine in the event of traffic violations. (Sep 2019).
c. ‘Swachh Police Station’. For efforts in disposal of abandoned and unclaimed vehicles in stations and keeping the premises clean. (Nov 2019).

References

1964 births

Living people
Indian Police Service officers